Qikou is a town in Dashiqiao, central Liaoning Province in Northeast China.

References

Towns in Liaoning